Jason Eric Bordoff (born 1972/1973) is an American energy policy expert, and a researcher specializing in the intersection of economics, energy, environment, and national security. In April 2021, he was named a Co-Founding Dean of the Columbia Climate School. Since 2013 he has served as the founding director of the Center on Global Energy Policy at Columbia University's School of International and Public Affairs, where he is also a professor of professional practice. From 2009 to 2013 he served in senior roles in the Obama administration on the Council on Environmental Quality, the National Economic Council, and the National Security Council.

Early life and education
Bordoff was born in Brooklyn, New York City, circa 1972. His father Fred S. Bordoff was an automotive diagnostics and repairs specialist who also managed retail gasoline outlets in Brooklyn, and his mother Ninette emigrated from the Middle East and is an attorney.

Bordoff earned a Bachelor of Arts in political science from Brown University in 1994. He received an M.Litt. in politics from Wadham College, Oxford University, on a Marshall Scholarship, in 1998. Bordoff received a J.D. from Harvard Law School in 2004.

Career

Early career 
Bordoff was a consultant with McKinsey & Company from 1998 to 2000. From 2000 to 2001, he served as special assistant to the Deputy Treasury Secretary Stuart Eizenstat during the Clinton administration. From 2004 to 2005 he was law clerk for the Hon. Stephen F. Williams of the U.S. Court of Appeals, D.C. Circuit.

Hamilton Project 
In 2005, Bordoff joined the Brookings Institution as the Policy Director of the Hamilton Project, a new organization within the Brookings Institution focused on economic research and policy. He held the position through April 2009.

In 2013, he joined a newly developed natural gas task force at Brookings.

Obama administration 
In April 2009, Bordoff joined the Obama White House as the Associate Director for Climate Change at the Council on Environmental Quality. He subsequently worked as Senior Advisor for Energy and Environmental Policy at the National Economic Council, and then Special Assistant to the President and Senior Director for Energy and Climate Change on the staff of the National Security Council, through January 2013.

Columbia University and the Center on Global Energy Policy 
In 2013, Bordoff joined Columbia University's School of International and Public Affairs (SIPA) as a professor of professional practice in international and public affairs. At the same time he also became the founding director of SIPA's Center on Global Energy Policy.

Memberships 
Bordoff is a member of the Council on Foreign Relations. He is a member of the National Petroleum Council, a federal advisory committee that makes recommendations to the U.S. Secretary of Energy. He is on the board of directors of the New York Energy Forum, and is a consultant to the National Intelligence Council. He is on the board of directors of Winrock International, a nonprofit organization whose mission is to increase economic opportunity, sustain natural resources, and protect the environment.

Journalism 
Bordoff has published articles in numerous news outlets including the New York Times, Wall Street Journal, and Financial Times. He is a columnist for Foreign Policy magazine. He co-edited a 2008 book with Jason Furman, Path to Prosperity: Hamilton Project Ideas on Income Security, Education, and Taxes, published by the Brookings Institution, and has written a number of journal articles, book chapters, and policy papers.

He is also a frequent commentator on television and radio, including NPR, Bloomberg, CNBC, and BBC.

Personal life 
Bordoff married Michelle Greene in 2001. They live in New York City, and have two children.

References

External links 
Official bio at Columbia University's School of International and Public Affairs

Alumni of Wadham College, Oxford
Brown University alumni
Columbia School of International and Public Affairs faculty
Harvard Law School alumni
Living people
Year of birth missing (living people)
Marshall Scholars